Mars Vs. Venus (金星火星大不同) is a Singaporean Mandarin talkshow previously hosted by YES 933 DJs Cruz Teng and Siau Jiahui, but currently hosted by Bryan Wong and Quan Yi Fong. Debuting on 13 Apr 2015, it is aired on MediaCorp Channel U as part of its revamp. It is premiered at 9pm on Mondays, with an encore telecast at 11.30pm on the same night. It aims to be a talk show that is rich in content, thought-provoking and critical in reflecting the personal values of the different sexes. Through various interaction and debates, the show will be witnessing the real characteristics of men and women in the show.

Hosts
Cruz Teng - currently Head of Singapore's top radio station YES 933 and host of its morning show.
Siau Jiahui - Host of YES 933's morning show

Concept
Mars Vs. Venus discusses gender based topics with a panel of local celebrities.

Lineup

References

Radio in Singapore